This is a list of films produced in Sweden and in the Swedish language in the 2010s. For an A-Z see :Category:Swedish films.

2010s

External links
 Swedish film at the Internet Movie Database

2010s
Films
Lists of 2010s films

nl:Lijst van Zweedse films
zh:瑞典電影列表